Dancemania Covers is a sub-series of the Dancemania compilation series, with various famous songs covered by various dance music acts.

Releases

Dancemania Covers
Dancemania Covers was released on July 16, 1997.

Dancemania Covers 2
Dancemania Covers 2 was released on March 18, 1998.

Dancemania Covers 01
Dancemania Covers 01 was released on March 24, 2005.

References

Covers
Covers albums